Azhar al-Dulaymi was an Iraqi who Brigadier General Kevin J. Bergner reported was a suspected member of the Mahdi army "Special Group" and was killed by U.S. forces on May 19, 2007.
Bergner did not describe how Dulaimi died.

On October 22, 2010, The New York Times reported that whistleblower organization WikiLeaks had published formerly secret documents where US intelligence analysts described why they thought al-Dulaimi had been trained in the "dark arts of paramilitary operation" by Iran and Hezbollah.

On October 25, 2010, the Foreign Policy Journal published an article skeptical of the conclusions The New York Times had drawn from the leaked documents.

According to Kimberly Kagan's The Surge: A Military History Dulaimi was "the executor of the Ministry of Health and Karbala attacks".
Bill Roggio, writing in the Long War Journal also attributed an attack on the Karbala Provincial Joint Coordination Center to Dulaimi.

According to Mark Urban's book on Special Forces in Iraq, Task Force Black, documents seized on March 20, 2007, when Qais Khazali and Ali Musa Daqduq were captured, described al Dulaimi's role in the Karbala attack and provided sufficient information for the raid where al-Dulaimi died.

References 

2007 deaths
Iraqi criminals
Iraqi insurgency (2003–2011)
Year of birth missing